Transtillaspis ependyma is a species of moth of the family Tortricidae. It is found in Ecuador (Loja Province) and Peru.

The wingspan is 17 mm. The ground colour of the forewings is ferruginous, mixed and dotted with brownish up to the middle. The markings are brownish. The hindwings are pale ochreous cream with brownish-grey strigulation (fine streaks).

Etymology
The species name refers to the colouration of the forewings covering the pale hindwings and is derived from Greek ependyma (meaning overcoat).

References

Moths described in 2005
Transtillaspis
Moths of South America
Taxa named by Józef Razowski